Fairfield Island is a residential and rural suburb of Chilliwack, British Columbia. Bounded by the Bell Slough and the Fraser River to the north, and the Hope Slough to the south, it is the northernmost neighbourhood in Chilliwack.

See also 
 Chilliwack
 Neighbourhoods in Chilliwack
 Rosedale, Chilliwack

References

External links 
 Community of Villages: Fairfield Island

Neighbourhoods in Chilliwack